Shorter Ideas is an album by saxophonist Ricky Ford featuring four compositions by Wayne Shorter which was recorded in 1984 and released on the Muse label.

Reception

The AllMusic review by Scott Yanow stated "Ford takes the lion's share of the solo space and is clearly up to the task, making these sometimes complex compositions seem accessible and logical. Ford has long been underrated (too old to be a Young Lion and too young to be an elder statesman), but based on the evidence of this recording alone he clearly deserves much greater acclaim".

Track listing
All compositions by Ricky Ford except where noted
 "Yes or No" (Wayne Shorter) – 5:36
 "Miyako" (Shorter) – 4:45
 "Dance Cadaverous" (Shorter) – 6:10
 "Pinnochio" (Shorter) – 3:38
 "Tabloid Blues" – 4:08
 "Wolf Trap" – 5:06
 "Happy Reunion" (Duke Ellington) – 4:15

Personnel
Ricky Ford - tenor saxophone, arranger
James Spaulding – alto saxophone, flute
Jimmy Knepper – trombone
Kirk Lightsey – piano 
Rufus Reid – bass 
Jimmy Cobb – drums

References

Muse Records albums
Ricky Ford albums
1984 albums
Albums recorded at Van Gelder Studio
Albums produced by Michael Cuscuna